The 10th LG Cup featured :

 13 players from China - Chang Hao, Chen Yaoye, Gu Li, Kong Jie, Liu Shizhen, Liu Xing, Luo Xihe, Piao Wenyao, Qiu Jun, Wang Xi, Wang Yuhui, Yu Bin, Zhou Heyang
 10 players from South Korea - Choi Cheol-han, Choi Myung-Hoon, Kim Kiyoung, Kim Seong-ryong, Lee Chang-ho, Lee Sedol, Park Byoung-kyu, Park Jungsang, Park Young-Hoon, Yun Hyunsuk
 6 players from Japan - Cho U, Hane Naoki, Kobayashi Koichi, O Rissei, So Yokoku, Yamashita Keigo
 1 player from Taiwan - Zhou Junxun
 1 player from North America - Huiren Yang
 1 player from Europe - Alexandre Dinerchtein

Two of the 32 players were given automatic berths, Cho U, who won the 9th LG Cup, was placed at the top of the table. The runner up for the 9th LG Cup, Yu Bin, was placed at the bottom.

Tournament

There was no third place game.

Final

LG Cup (Go)
2006 in go